Regine is a 1956 West German drama film directed by Harald Braun and starring Johanna Matz, Erik Schumann and Horst Buchholz.

It was shot at the Bavaria Studios in Munich. The film's sets were designed by the art director Kurt Herlth and Robert Herlth.

Cast
 Johanna Matz as Regine Winter
 Erik Schumann as Martin Lund
 Horst Buchholz as Karl Winter
 Viktor Staal as Friedrich Wentland
 Käthe Dorsch as Therese Lund
 Rudolf Forster as Geheimrat Hansen
 Gustav Knuth as Der alte Winter
 Ursula Lingen as Rita Carsten
 Ernst Waldow as Direktor Casten
 Siegfried Lowitz as Direktor Gisevius
 Herbert Hübner as Der General
 Peter Arens as Der Leutnant
 Ursula von Reibnitz as Frau von Herms
 Gerd Seid as Franz
 Peter Baalcke as  Willi
 Manfred Schaeffer as Der alte Krafft

See also
Regine (1935)

References

Bibliography 
 Bock, Hans-Michael & Bergfelder, Tim. The Concise CineGraph. Encyclopedia of German Cinema. Berghahn Books, 2009.

External links 
 

1956 films
1956 drama films
German drama films
West German films
1950s German-language films
Films directed by Harald Braun
Films based on short fiction
Films based on works by Gottfried Keller
Remakes of German films
Films shot at Bavaria Studios
1950s German films
German black-and-white films